Girl Germs was a zine created by University of Oregon students Allison Wolfe and Molly Neuman, both members of the band Bratmobile.

Feminism was influential in the Pacific Northwest in the early nineties:  Girl Germs identified feminist role models in its early issues and was one of the few Riot grrrl zines created by young white women to feature African American rappers.

The first issue of Girl Germs was completed by December 1990. While home in Washington, D.C. on winter break, Neuman made several hundred copies of the zine at the Capitol Hill offices of Arizona Representative Mo Udall, who she had worked for during high school.

Contributors to Girl Germs included Kathleen Hanna; Jean Smith of Mecca Normal; Sue P. Fox; Kaia Wilson; the editors of Double Bill, G.B. Jones, Jena von Brücker, Caroline Azar, Johnny Noxzema and Rex; Jen Smith; and Erin Smith of Bratmobile. Groups interviewed by Girl Germs editors include Calamity Jane, Unrest, 7 Year Bitch, Jawbox and Fastbacks.

Girl Germs also documents the coming together of Bratmobile, during this time.  Allison would go on to play with Cold Cold Hearts, Partyline, and Hawnay Troof and Molly played with The Frumpies and The PeeChees.

Archives that have copies of Girl Germs include the GLBT Historical Society in San Francisco, California, the Independent Publishing Resource Center in Portland, Oregon,  Duke University in Durham, North Carolina, and Barnard College.

Quotes
"We're helping open male audience members minds. Like, 'Oh wow, you're women and you can play!' But it's like, No shit!" - Selene, of band Seven Year Bitch, on sexism in music (issue 18)

References

External links
Article on riot grrrl

1990 establishments in Oregon
Fanzines
Feminism and history
Feminism in the United States
Defunct women's magazines published in the United States
Feminist magazines
Magazines established in 1990
Magazines published in Oregon
Riot grrrl
Women in Oregon
Zines
Magazines with year of disestablishment missing